The 2012 WNBA season is the 15th season for the Tulsa Shock of the Women's National Basketball Association. It is their third in Tulsa.

Transactions

WNBA Draft
The following are the Shock's selections in the 2012 WNBA Draft.

Transaction log
February 1, 2011: The Shock traded a second-round pick in the 2012 Draft to the Los Angeles Sparks in exchange for Andrea Riley.
April 11, 2011: The Shock acquired second- and third-round picks in the 2012 Draft from the San Antonio Silver Stars in exchange for Scholanda Robinson.
January 12: The Shock traded Andrea Riley to the Phoenix Mercury in exchange for Temeka Johnson.
February 10: The Shock re-signed Amber Holt, Abi Olajuwon, and Shanna Zolman.
February 13: The Shock re-signed Jennifer Lacy.
February 17: The Shock signed Scholanda Dorrell.
February 27: The Shock signed Jené Morris.
March 5: The Shock signed Chanel Mokango.
April 17: The Shock signed Lorin Dixon.
April 23: The Shock signed draft picks Vicki Baugh and Lynetta Kizer and waived Abi Olajuwon.
April 26: The Shock signed draft picks Glory Johnson and Riquna Williams.
April 27: The Shock signed Marshae Dotson and waived Chanel Mokango.
May 6: The Shock waived Marshae Dotson.
May 14: The Shock waived Lorin Dixon and Vicki Baugh.
May 15: The Shock waived Amber Holt and Shanna Zolman.
June 17: The Shock waived Jene Morris.
June 18: The shock signed Amber Holt and Courtney Paris and waived Lynetta Kizer.
July 2: The Shock traded Karima Christmas to the Indiana Fever in exchange for Roneeka Hodges.

Trades

Personnel changes

Additions

Subtractions

Roster

Depth

Season standings

Schedule

Preseason

|- align="center" bgcolor="ffbbbb"
| 1 || Sat 5 || 2:00 || @ Atlanta ||  || 89-91 || Latta (18) || Morris (6) || Latta (4) || Philips Arena  4,340 || 0-1
|- align="center" bgcolor="bbffbb"
| 2 || Fri 11 || 12:30 || Seattle ||  || 86-60 || G. JohnsonWilliams (10) || Kizer (5) || T. Johnson (5) || BOK Center  5,297 || 1-1
|-

Regular season

|- align="center" bgcolor="ffbbbb"
| 1 || Sat 19 || 8:00 || San Antonio || FS-SW || 79-88 || T. Johnson (21) || G. Johnson (10) || T. Johnson (9) || BOK Center  7,509 || 0-1
|- align="center" bgcolor="ffbbbb"
| 2 || Tue 22 || 8:00 || Phoenix ||  || 87-89 || T. JohnsonLatta (16) || Black (7) || T. Johnson (7) || BOK Center  5,341 || 0-2
|- align="center" bgcolor="ffbbbb"
| 3 || Sat 26 || 7:00 || @ Washington ||  || 61-64 || Latta (16) || T. Johnson (5) || T. Johnson (4) || Verizon Center  11,866 || 0-3
|- align="center" bgcolor="ffbbbb"
| 4 || Tue 29 || 10:30 || @ Los Angeles ||  || 75-76 || Williams (19) || G. JohnsonPedersenWilliams (5) || T. Johnson (5) || Staples Center  8,312 || 0-4
|-

|- align="center" bgcolor="ffbbbb"
| 5 || Fri 1 || 10:00 || @ Seattle ||  || 58-76 || Lacy (12) || G. JohnsonPedersen (6) || Williams (3) || KeyArena  7,489 || 0-5
|- align="center" bgcolor="ffbbbb"
| 6 || Sun 3 || 6:00 || @ Phoenix ||  || 72-79 || Lacy (19) || T. Johnson (9) || T. JohnsonLatta (3) || US Airways Center  7,178 || 0-6
|- align="center" bgcolor="ffbbbb"
| 7 || Fri 8 || 8:30 ||  @ Chicago || CN100 || 91-98 (OT) || Latta (25) || Pedersen (9) || T. JohnsonLatta (6) || Allstate Arena  5,019 || 0-7
|- align="center" bgcolor="ffbbbb"
| 8 || Sat 9 || 8:00 || Minnesota ||  || 73-93 || Lacy (15) || Pedersen (10) || T. Johnson (6) || BOK Center  5,113 || 0-8
|- align="center" bgcolor="ffbbbb"
| 9 || Fri 15 || 8:00 || Seattle ||  || 73-86  || Lacy (16) || G. JohnsonPedersenT. JohnsonLatta (5) || T. Johnson (8) || BOK Center  5,100  || 0-9 
|- align="center" bgcolor="bbffbb"
| 10 || Sun 17 || 4:00 || Phoenix ||  || 87-75 || T. Johnson (22) || G. Johnson (9) || T. Johnson (5) || BOK Center  4,200 || 1-9
|- align="center" bgcolor="ffbbbb"
| 11 || Wed 20 || 10:30 || @ Los Angeles ||  || 79-95 || G. Johnson (19) || G. JohnsonParis (8) || T. Johnson (4) || Staples Center  8,388 || 1-10
|- align="center" bgcolor="ffbbbb"
| 12 || Sat 23 || 8:00 || Indiana ||  || 70-73 || G. Johnson (22) || Paris (11) || Latta (5) || BOK Center  4,209 || 1-11
|- align="center" bgcolor="bbffbb"
| 13 || Tue 26 || 8:00 || Los Angeles ||  || 91-75 || Williams (27) || G. JohnsonPedersen (6) || Latta (8) || BOK Center  4,102 || 2-11
|- align="center" bgcolor="ffbbbb"
| 14 || Fri 29 || 8:00 || Atlanta ||  || 92-102 || G. JohnsonLatta (16) || Pedersen (8) || T. Johnson (8) || BOK Center  4,235 || 2-12
|-

|- align="center" bgcolor="ffbbbb"
| 15 || Fri 6 || 8:00 || Connecticut ||  || 75-86 || Latta (24) || G. Johnson (7) || Pedersen (5) || BOK Center  4,318 || 2-13
|- align="center" bgcolor="bbffbb"
| 16 || Sun 8 || 4:00 || Washington ||  || 78-62 || Latta (18) || Latta (6) || T. JohnsonLatta (3) || BOK Center  4,003 || 3-13
|- align="center" bgcolor="ffbbbb"
| 17 || Tue 10 || 12:30 || Minnesota ||  || 86-107 || Latta (25) || 5 players (3) || T. Johnson (7) || BOK Center  6,012 || 3-14
|- align="center" bgcolor="ffbbbb"
| 18 || Thu 12 || 1:00 || @ Minnesota ||  || 74-89 || G. Johnson (30) || G. Johnson (14) || Latta (4) || Target Center  15,318 || 3-15
|-
| colspan="11" align="center" valign="middle" | Summer Olympic break
|-

|-
| colspan="11" align="center" valign="middle" | Summer Olympic break
|- align="center" bgcolor="ffbbbb"
| 19 || Fri 17 || 8:00 || San Antonio ||  || 79-89 || Williams (17) || Pedersen (8) || T. Johnson (6) || BOK Center  6,270 || 3-16
|- align="center" bgcolor="ffbbbb"
| 20 || Sun 19 || 7:00 || @ Minnesota || NBATV || 59-83 || G. Johnson (17) || G. Johnson (12) || T. Johnson || Target Center  10,223 || 3-17
|- align="center" bgcolor="ffbbbb"
| 21 || Tue 21 || 7:00 || @ Connecticut ||  || 80-82(OT) || T. JohnsonLacy (14) || G. Johnson (15) || T. Johnson (7) || Mohegan Sun Arena  6,745 || 3-18
|- align="center" bgcolor="bbffbb"
| 22 || Fri 24 || 8:00 || Chicago ||  || 81-78(OT) || HodgesWilliams (22) || G. Johnson (12) || G. Johnson (5) || BOK Center  5,147 || 4-18
|- align="center" bgcolor="ffbbbb"
| 23 || Sat 25 || 8:00 || @ San Antonio || FS-SW || 71-91 || Williams (17)  || G. Johnson (9)  || Latta (5)  || AT&T Center  9,029 || 4-19
|- align="center" bgcolor="bbffbb"
| 24 || Tue 28 || 7:00 || @ Atlanta || FS-S || 84-80 || Hodges (20)  || G. Johnson (8) || T. Johnson (6) || Philips Arena  2,813 || 5-19
|- align="center" bgcolor="bbffbb"
| 25 || Thu 30 || 8:00 || Los Angeles ||  || 99-85 || Latta (21) || Holt G. Johnson (6) || Latta (14) || BOK Center  5,275 || 6-19
|- align="center" bgcolor="ffbbbb"
| 26 || Fri 31 || 8:00 || @ Minnesota || NBATV || 83-92 || Williams (21) || G. Johnson (6) || G. Johnson  Latta (4)  || Target Center  9,213 || 6-20 
|-

|- align="center" bgcolor="ffbbbb"
| 27 || Thu 6 || 10:00 || @ Seattle ||  || 74-101 || Latta (18) || R. Hodges (7) || R. Williams (5) || KeyArena  5,948 || 6-21
|- align="center" bgcolor="ffbbbb"
| 28 || Sat 8 || 8:00 || Seattle ||  || 66-89 || Latta (14) || Pedersen (7) || R. Williams (6) || BOK Center  7,415 || 6-22
|- align="center" bgcolor="ffbbbb"
| 29 || Wed 12 || 8:00 || San Antonio ||  || 67-78 || G. Johnson (18) || Hodges (6) || T. Johnson (4) || BOK Center  4,543 || 6-23
|- align="center" bgcolor="bbffbb"
| 30 || Fri 14 || 10:00 || @ Phoenix || || 92-84  || Latta (20)  || R. WilliamsG. Johnson (6) || R. Williams (4) || US Airways Center  6,719 || 7-23
|- align="center" bgcolor="bbffbb"
| 31 || Sun 16 || 3:00 || @ San Antonio ||  || 80-70 || T. Johnson (18) || G. Johnson (11) || Latta (4)  || AT&T Center  5,246 || 8-23
|- align="center" bgcolor="bbffbb"
| 32 || Thu 20 || 8:00 || New York ||  || 78-66 || T. Johnson (26)   || G. Johnson (7) ||  T. Johnson (6) || BOK Center  5,661  || 9-23 
|- align="center" bgcolor="ffbbbb"
| 33 || Sat 22 || 2:00 || @ New York || NBATVMSG || 74-91 || Latta (16)  || ParisPedersenR. WilliamsG. Johnson (4) || Latta (6) || Prudential Center   8,508 || 9-24
|- align="center" bgcolor="ffbbbb"
| 34 || Sun 23 || 5:00 || @ Indiana || NBATVFS-I || 58-91  || Latta (16) || G. Johnson (11)  || Latta (4) || Bankers Life Fieldhouse  9,225 || 9-25
|-

| All games are viewable on WNBA LiveAccess or ESPN3.com

Statistics

Regular season

Awards and honors

References

External links
2012 Tulsa Shock season at ESPN

Tulsa Shock seasons
Tulsa
Tulsa Shock